John Donne (1573–1631) was a poet.

John Donne is also the name of:

 Sir John Donne (1420s–1503), Welsh courtier and diplomat
 John Donne the Younger (1604–1662), son of the poet

See also
 John Done (c. 1747–1831), Justice of the Maryland Court of Appeals